Gaddis  is a surname. Notable people with the surname include:

 C. J. Gaddis (born 1985), America football player
 Christian Gaddis (born 1984), American football player
 Gadabout Gaddis (1896-1986), American television fisherman
 Hunter Gaddis (born 1998), American baseball player
 John Lewis Gaddis (born 1939),American  historian of the Cold War and grand strategy
 Miranda Gaddis, American crime victim
 Thomas E. Gaddis (1908–1984), American author
 Vincent Gaddis (1913–1997), American author
 William Gaddis (1922-1998), American novelist

See also
 Gaddis Smith (1932-2022), American historian